Donald Alan Symon (born 20 May 1960) is a former New Zealand rower who won an Olympic bronze medal at the 1984 Summer Olympics in Los Angeles.

Symon was born in 1960 in Christchurch, New Zealand. Along with Kevin Lawton, Barrie Mabbott, Ross Tong and Brett Hollister (cox) Symon won the bronze medal in the coxed four. Symon also won a silver medal in the coxless four and a bronze medal in the eight at the 1986 Commonwealth Games in Edinburgh. He is listed as New Zealand Olympian athlete number 508 by the New Zealand Olympic Committee.

References

External links
 
 

1960 births
Living people
New Zealand male rowers
Olympic rowers of New Zealand
Olympic bronze medalists for New Zealand
Rowers at the 1984 Summer Olympics
Commonwealth Games silver medallists for New Zealand
Commonwealth Games bronze medallists for New Zealand
Rowers at the 1986 Commonwealth Games
Rowers from Christchurch
Olympic medalists in rowing
Medalists at the 1984 Summer Olympics
Commonwealth Games medallists in rowing
Medallists at the 1986 Commonwealth Games